A slug is a gastropod mollusk without a shell or with a very small internal shell.

Slug or slugs may also refer to:

Objects
 Slug (coin), a counterfeit coin
 Slug (projectile), a solid ballistic projectile
 Slug (railroad), an accessory to a diesel-electric locomotive
 Slug or blank, a piece of bar stock ready to be machined into a finished part

Publishing
 Slug (publishing), a short name given in newspaper editing to articles that are in production
 Slug (typesetting), a piece of spacing material used in typesetting to space paragraphs
 Slug (web publishing), a user- and SEO-friendly short text used in a URL to identify and describe a resource

Arts, entertainment, and media

Fictional characters
 Slug (comics), a villain in the Marvel Comics universe
 Lord Slug, the main antagonist of the fourth Dragon Ball Z movie

Films
 Slugs (1988 film), based on the Shaun Hutson novel
 Slugs (2004 film), German film

Music

Groups
 Slug (American band), an American noise rock band
 Slug (British band), a British art-rock band
 Slugs, the backing group of Doug and the Slugs, a Canadian pop music group

Songs
 "Slug" (song), a 1995 song by Passengers (U2 and Brian Eno)
 "Slug", a bonus song on the 1990 compilation album All the Stuff (And More) Volume Two by The Ramones

Other uses in arts, entertainment, and media
 SLUG Magazine, Salt Lake Under Ground magazine
 Slugs (novel), a 1982 novel by Shaun Hutson
 The Slug, a pop culture blog for the defunct web portal asap

Science and technology
 Slug (unit), a unit of mass in the Imperial system
 Grex (biology), an aggregation of amoebae
 Slug, a nickname for the Linksys NSLU2
 Slugs (autopilot system), an open-source autopilot system oriented toward inexpensive autonomous aircraft

Sports
 Slug, another name for Chinese handball
 Slugs, a nickname of the Buffalo Sabres National Hockey League team - see List of ice hockey nicknames
 Slugs, a nickname for the UC Santa Cruz Banana Slugs, the sports teams of the University of California, Santa Cruz

People
 Slug (rapper), an underground rapper best known as a member of the hip-hop group Atmosphere
 Ray Jordon (1937–2012), Australian cricketer, nicknamed Slug
 Steve Russell (computer scientist) (born 1937), American computer scientist, creator of the early video game Spacewar!, nicknamed Slug
 Casimir Witucki (1928–2015), American National Football League player, nicknamed Slug

Other uses
 "Slug road", a colloquial name for the A957 roadway in eastern Scotland, UK
 Slug, a synonym for punch (combat)
 The Slug, a derogatory nickname for The Cloud, Auckland, a multi-purpose event venue in Auckland, New Zealand
 The Slug, another name for the Sunbeam 1000 hp land speed record car known as Mystery

See also
 Slugger (disambiguation)
 Slugging, a carpooling 

Lists of people by nickname